2011 in the Philippines details events of note that happened in the Philippines in the year 2011.

Incumbents

 

 President: Benigno Aquino III
 Vice President: Jejomar Binay
 Senate President: Juan Ponce Enrile
 House Speaker: Feliciano Belmonte, Jr.
 Chief Justice: Renato Corona
 Philippine Congress: 15th Congress of the Philippines

Events

January

 January 5 – Heavy rains spawn flash floods and landslides that leave at least 10 people dead in several regions in Mindanao.
 January 18  – The Supreme Court (SC) denies Lauro Vizconde's appeal for reconsideration of its decision acquitting Hubert Webb and six other co-accused in the Vizconde massacre case.
 January 19  – Vice President Jejomar Binay joins calls for the re-imposition of death penalty in the country, in light of the perceived resurgence of heinous crimes.
 January 22 – Raymond Dominguez, suspected leader of a notorious carnapping syndicate, surrenders to police in Malolos City, Bulacan, after being tagged as the mastermind in three gruesome murders. The Dominguez brothers, Raymond and Roger, are allegedly involved in the killings of car dealers Venson Evangelista, Emerson Lozano, and the latter's driver, Ernani Sencil. On February 10, Roger Dominguez, suspected carjack ring leader and brother of Raymond Dominguez, is arrested after being flagged down for violating traffic rules in Timog Avenue, Quezon City. Like his brother, the older Dominguez is linked to the killings of Venzon Evangelista and Ernane Sencil in January.
 January 23 – The death toll from the 2010–2011 Philippine floods rises to 68 with 26 others still missing.
 January 24:
 The country's first successful liver transplant is performed on a child, three-year-old Catherine Erica Buenaventura.
 A 17-year-old student of the University of the Philippines, Danica Flores Magpantay, is named the 2011 Ford Models Supermodel of the World.
 January 27 – During a hearing at the Senate, former military budget officer Lt. Col George Rabusa bares a "pabaon" (send-off) system in the Armed Forces of the Philippines (AFP) and reveals how AFP chiefs allegedly raked in millions in illegal wealth. According to Rabusa, then outgoing AFP Chief of Staff Angelo Reyes allegedly received not less than P50 million as "pabaon" when he retired in 2001.

February

 February 1 – Heidi Mendoza, a former auditor at the Commission on Audit (COA), reveals alleged irregularities and cover-ups in financial transactions involving the Armed Forces of the Philippines (AFP).
 February 3 – The Court of Appeals clears Senator Panfilo Lacson for the alleged murders of publicist Bubby Dacer and his driver Emmanuel Corbito.
 February 8 – Former Armed Forces of the Philippines chief of staff Angelo Reyes commits suicide amidst graft charges.
 February 15 – Voting 7–6, the Supreme Court rules that the municipalities of Baybay, Leyte; Bogo, Cebu; Catbalogan, Samar; Tandag, Surigao del Sur; Lamitan, Basilan; Borongan, Eastern Samar; Tayabas, Quezon; Tabuk, Kalinga; Bayugan, Agusan del Sur; Batac, Ilocos Norte; Mati, Davao Oriental; Guihulngan, Negros Oriental; Cabadbaran, Agusan del Norte; El Salvador, Misamis Oriental; Carcar, Cebu and Naga, Cebu can stay as cities. The court stated that their conversion to cityhood met all legal requirements.
 February 20 – After months of little activity, the Bulusan volcano suddenly erupts and sends a plume of ash 2 kilometers high.
 February 24 – Ilocos Sur Representative Ronald Singson, son of former Governor Chavit Singson, is sentenced to 1-year and 6 months of imprisonment in Hong Kong for possession of illegal drugs. Singson was caught by local authorities in July 2010 with 6.67 grams of pure cocaine and two tablets of the narcotic Nitrazepam at Hong Kong's international airport.

March
 March 1 – After being sentenced to over a year of imprisonment in Hong Kong, Ronald Singson resigns as the representative of the first district of Ilocos Sur.
 March 21 – The House of Representatives votes (212–46) to impeach Ombudsman Merceditas Gutierrez.
 March 24 – For failing to attend the inquiry into military corruption without a justifiable reason, former AFP comptroller Jacinto Ligot and his wife Erlinda are cited in contempt by the Senate and hold in Senate custody.
 March 26 – Senator Panfilo Lacson returns to the Philippines after more than a year away from the country.

April
 April 7 – A press conference in DOJ is held. BIR Commissioner Kim Henares filed a case against Rep. Mikey Arroyo, his wife Angela and Brazilian model-actress Daiana Menezes.
 April 22 – An unexpected landslide happens on Compostella Valley, where 13 miners are killed.

May
 May 8–9 – Typhoon Bebeng enters the Philippine area of Responsibility, and hits Bicol region where 20 people reported dead while 2 still missing.
 May 10 – The local government of Camarines Sur, declares the province under a state of calamity due to Typhoon Bebeng.

June
 June 29 – Philippine National Railways inaugurates Bicol Express rail service from Tutuban to Naga City. however, as of April 2015 services had still not been resumed.

August
 August 11 – Koko Pimentel is proclaimed as a new Senator of the Republic of the Philippines, replacing Juan Miguel Zubiri, who resigned on August 3.

September
 September 27 – Typhoon Pedring (international name Nesat) made its landfall in the provinces of Isabela and Aurora and affected Metro Manila. It caused heavy damage to infrastructure. 9 confirmed death, almost 2 billion pesos cost of damage was reported and at least 20 fishermen were reported missing.

November
 November 18 – Former Philippine President Gloria Macapagal Arroyo is arrested after a Pasay court issued a warrant of arrest against her, following the filing of a complaint for electoral sabotage by the Commission on Elections. The arrest warrant was served at a St. Luke's Medical Center at Taguig where Arroyo had been confined.

December
 December 9 – Arroyo is detained at the Veterans Memorial Medical Center in Quezon City after her transfer through ambulance lift.
 December 10 – Parañaque plane crash kills 14 people in a slum area.
 December 12 – 188 members of the House of Representatives sign an impeachment complaint against Chief Justice Renato Corona. As only 95 signatures were necessary for the impeachment of Corona by the House of Representatives under the Constitution, the impeachment complaint was to be transmitted to the Senate for trial.
 December 14 – The Senate of the Philippines convenes as an impeachment court against Chief Justice Renato Corona.
 December 16–18 – Typhoon Sendong (international name Washi) crossed the Visayas and Mindanao region, leaving almost 1,500 people dead and more than thousands missing.

Holidays

On December 11, 2009, Republic Act No. 9849 declared Eidul Adha as a regular holiday. Also amending Executive Order No. 292, also known as The Administrative Code of 1987, the following are regular and special days shall be observed. The EDSA Revolution Anniversary was proclaimed since 2002 as a special nonworking holiday. On February 25, 2004, Republic Act No. 9256 declared every August 21 as a special nonworking holiday to be known as Ninoy Aquino Day. Note that in the list, holidays in bold are "regular holidays" and those in italics are "nationwide special days".

 January 1 – New Year's Day
 February 25 – EDSA Revolution Anniversary
 April 9 – Araw ng Kagitingan (Day of Valor)
 April 21 – Maundy Thursday
 April 22 – Good Friday
 May 1 – Labor Day
 June 12 – Independence Day
 August 21 –  Ninoy Aquino Day
 August 28 – National Heroes Day
 August 30 – Eidul Fitr
 November 1 – All Saints Day
 November 6 – Eid al-Adha
 November 30 – Bonifacio Day
 December 25 – Christmas Day
 December 30 – Rizal Day
 December 31 – Last Day of the Year

In addition, several other places observe local holidays, such as the foundation of their town. These are also "special days."

Concerts
January 8 – 1@11 – Gary Valenciano, Charice: SM Mall of Asia open grounds
January 8 – Bone Thugs N' Harmony live at SMX Convention Center
January 11 – Mega 2011 – The Sharon Cuneta Birthday Concert: Araneta Coliseum
January 15:
Big Fish Trance NRG live at A-Venue Events Hall
Bob Sinclar – live at World Trade Center, Pasay
The Kapamilya Ultimate Leading Men – Waterfront Hotel, Cebu City
January 20 – LMFAO live at Republiq Superclub
January 21 – China Crisis live at Eastwood Mall Open Park
January 21–22 – The CompanY: Isang Pasasalamat – The Sanctuary of Word for the World Christian Fellowship, Makati
January 22:
China Crisis live at Venice Piazza, McKinley Hill
Pambansang Musiklaban: Francis Magalona Tribute live at SM Mall of Asia open grounds
January 25 – Lani Misalucha – The Nightingale Sings – Newport Performing Arts Theater
February 4 – Janet Jackson Number Ones Up Close and Personal World Tour: PICC Plenary Hall
February 5:
ASAP Sessionistas 20.11 – Araneta Coliseum
Kim Kyu Jong and Heo Young Saeng of SS501 live at PICC Forum 2
February 9 – Trini Lopez – Waterfront Hotel, Cebu City
February 10 – Trini Lopez – Araneta Coliseum
February 11:
Jovit Baldivino Faithfully: Lahug, Cebu City
Love Rocks: feat. Stephen Bishop, Dan Hill and Yvonne Elliman – Araneta Coliseum
February 11–12 – And I Love Her – Jericho Rosales and Gabriel Valenciano: Teatrino, Promande, Greenhills
February 12:
A Night with Jose Mari Chan – Island Cove Hotel and Leisure Park, Kawit, Cavite
Deftones: Diamond Eyes Tour live at World Trade Center, Pasay
Fra Lippo Lippi live at University of Baguio
i Valentine U – Ogie Alcasid, Pops Fernandez and Regine Velasquez: Crowne Plaza Galleria Manila
What Love Is – Martin Nievera & Sarah Geronimo: Araneta Coliseum
February 12–13 – The Greatest Love Songs of our Time: Kuh Ledesma and the Hitmakers live at PICC Plenary Hall
February 14:
Fra Lippo Lippi live at NBC Tent
My Beautiful Girls – Christian Bautista, Venus Raj, Krista Kleiner and Wendy Tabusalla with Resorts World Manila Dancers and Manila Philharmonic Orchestra: Newport Performing Arts Theater in Resorts World Manila
Piolo Meets The Maestro – Piolo Pascual, Ryan Cayabyab, Yeng Constantino and Sitti Navarro: PICC Plenary Hall
February 15 – Heart at Tux – The Tux: Music Museum
February 18:
Neocolours The Reunion: Eastwood Mall
Voizes in the Rain – Voiz Boyz and The Rainmakers: Music Museum
February 18–19 – Chippendales live at Newport Performing Arts Theater
February 19 – Taylor Swift live at the Araneta Coliseum
February 20 – Yellowcard live at A-Venue Hall Makati
February 26:
Jovit Baldivino Faithfully: Music Museum
Park Mi Kyung live at Newport Performing Arts Theater
Super Junior: Super Show 3 live at Araneta Coliseum
March 1 – Sugarfree's Farewell Concert: Eastwood Mall
March 2 – Starry Starry Night with Don McLean: Araneta Coliseum
March 4 – Opera Belles Live in Concert: Eastwood Mall Open Park
March 9:
Stone Temple Pilots live 8:00 pm at Araneta Coliseum
Anberlin live at A-Venue Hall Makati
March 11 – Opera Belles Live in Concert: Venice Piazza at McKinley Hill
March 12:
Planetshakers live at Philsports Arena
The Whitest Boy Alive live at Republiq, Resorts World Manila
March 29 – David Pomeranz and Lea Salonga live at Resorts World Manila
April 1 – P*Pop Explosion feat. Pop Girls, XLR8 and RPM live at the Aliw Theater
April 6 – Good Charlotte live at Glorietta Mall, Makati
April 7 – Bruno Mars live at Araneta Coliseum
April 14 – Balikbayani feat. Gary Valenciano, Ogie Alcasid, Lea Salonga etc. live at the Araneta Coliseum
April 15 – Wency Cornejo: Here and Now – feat. After Image and Cookie Chua live at Promenade, Greenhills, San Juan City
April 16 – The Script live at the Araneta Coliseum
April 26 – Basil Valdez and Zsa Zsa Padilla live at the Araneta Coliseum
April 28 – 2AM live at Newport Plaza, Resorts World, Manila
April 29 – 2AM live at Venice Piazza, McKinley Hall
April 30:
2AM live at Eastwood Mall Open Park
PULP Summerslam XI live at Amoranto Stadium
Switchfoot Live at Philsports Arena
May 1 – Nervecell live at Nuvo Parking Lot Lahug, Cebu City
May 6–7 – My One and Only feat. Kuh Ledesma, Isabella and Jon Santos live at the Music Museum
May 7:
Jennylyn Mercado Coming from the Rain live at Zirkoh, Timog Avenue, Quezon City
Lee DeWyze live at Venice Piazza, McKinley Hall
May 8 – Lee DeWyze live at Eastwood Mall Open Park
May 10:
Justin Bieber My World Tour live at SM Mall of Asia Open Grounds
Mr. Big live at the Araneta Coliseum
May 12 – Air Supply live at the Aliw Theater
May 13 – Rock N' Roll Era feat. Parokya ni Edgar, Kamikazee and Rivermaya live at Metro Bar
May 14 – John Lapus – Sweet @ 18 live at Music Museum
May 16 – Pulp Unleashed Present: Asking Alexandria live at Amoranto Theater, Quezon City
May 22 – Kenny Loggins live at SMX Convention Center
May 23:
Kenny G live at the PICC Plenary Hall
Maroon 5 live at SMX Convention Center
May 24 – Pops Fernandez in Fashion live at Newport Performing Arts Theater
June 2 – Hillsong United Aftermath Tour live at Araneta Coliseum
June 4:
2NE1 live at the Araneta Coliseum
Tsai Chin Hu and Chang Hsiu Ching live at Newport Performing Arts Theater in Resorts World Manila
June 14 – Pops Fernandez in Fashion live at Newport Performing Arts Theater in Resorts World Manila
June 17 – Miley Cyrus Corazon Gitano Tour live at SM Mall of Asia open grounds
June 18 – Wolfgang live at Metropolitan Theater
June 24–25 – David Choi live at the Music Museum
June 24–26 and July 1–2 – The Music of Andrew Lloyd Webber live at CCP Main Theater
June 24–July 10 – Aida the Music live at Carlos P. Romulo Theater, RCBC Plaza, Makati 
June 28 – Ryan Cayabyab and Friends live at Newport Performing Arts Theater in Resorts World Manila
June 29 – RJ Bistro Presents: Sing-A-Long Doo Wop Night live at Dusit Thani Hotel, Makati
July 1 – Vice Ganda: Todo Sample sa Araneta live at Araneta Coliseum
July 3 – Bocaue Fluvial Festival
July 4 – Bobby Kimball live at SMX Convention Center
July 5 – Kylie Minogue Aphrodite Tour live at Araneta Coliseum
July 7 – Marilyn McCoo and Billy Davis, Jr. live at Araneta Coliseum
July 15 – Angeline Quinto: Patuloy Ang Mangarap live at SM North Edsa Skydome
July 16 & 23 – Martin Nievera Tribute live at Newport Performing Arts Theater in Resorts World Manila
July 18 – David Archuleta live at the Araneta Coliseum
July 23 – The CompanY and Jose Mari Chan: It's Complicated live at SMX Convention Center
July 28 – Incubus: If Not Now, When? World Tour – Philippine Leg Concert live at Araneta Coliseum
July 29 – Thirty Seconds to Mars live at Trinoma Mall/Mindanao Parking
August 5:
Rakenroll Jamming with Yeng Constantino feat. Tutti Caringal, Gloc 9, Raymund Marasigan and Sam Milby live at the Aliw Theater
Timeless – Golden 60's Hits feat. Chip Hawkes, RJ Jacinto & Gerry and the Pacemakers live at Waterfront Hotel, Lahug, Cebu City
August 6 – Timeless – Golden 60's Hits feat. Chip Hawkes, RJ Jacinto & Gerry and the Pacemakers live at PICC Plenary Hall, Pasay
August 10 – Korn live at the Araneta Coliseum
August 13 – Rachelle Ann Go live at Eastwood Mall Open Park 
August 14 – Rachelle Ann Go live at Venice Piazza, McKinley Hall 
August 19–26 – Solenn Heussaff On Stage live at Teatrino 
August 20 – Psor Rocks feat. Cueshe, Slapshock, General Luna, Kenyo, etc. live at Bay Park Service Road, Roxas Boulevard, Pasay 
August 23 – Ogie Alcasid – Celebration: A Birthday Concert live at Newport Performing Arts Theater in Resorts World Manila 
August 24 – Ed Kowalczyk live at the Araneta Coliseum 
August 25 – Kim Hyun Joong "Break Down" live at Trinoma Activity Center 
August 27 – Erik Bana live at the Meralco Theater 
September 2–18: In The Heights (Musical) live at Carlos P. Romulo Teater RCBC Plaza, Makati 
September 7 – All-4-One and Color Me Badd live at the Araneta Coliseum 
September 9:
All-4-One and Color Me Badd live at Waterfront Hotel, Lahug, Cebu City
China Crisis and Ex-Simple Minds live at SMX Convention Center 
September 16:
In The Company of Side A live at Newport Performing Arts Theater in Resorts World Manila 
Rock Rizal 2011 feat. Gloc 9, Sandwich, Ebe Dancel, Peryodiko, Jett Pangan and Radioactive Sago Project live at SM Mall of Asia 
Sitti Ang Aking Awitin live at Music Museum 
September 16 & 17 – Martin Nievera Tribute live at Newport Performing Arts Theater in Resorts World Manila
September 20 & 21 – American Idol Live Tour at the Araneta Coliseum 
September 22:
All Time Low live at the Araneta Coliseum 
Zia Quizon: Simple Girl live at Teatrino, Greenhills 
September 23–25 – Mickey's Music Festival live at Waterfront Hotel, Lahug, Cebu City 
September 27 – Broadway Showstoppers feat. Leo Valdez, Joanna Ampil, Ima Castro, Opera Belles and Primo live at Newport Performing Arts Theater in Resorts World Manila 
September 29 – Westlife – Gravity World Tour live at the Araneta Coliseum 
September 30:
The Wild Swans live at Waterfront Hotel, Lahug, Cebu City 
Toni Gonzaga: Toni @ 10 – The 10th Anniversary Celebration live at the Araneta Coliseum
October 1 – The Wild Swans live at One Esplanade, SM Mall of Asia
October 5–9 – Mickey's Music Festival live at the Araneta Coliseum 
October 9 – Lenka live at A-Venue, Makati 
October 10 – The Human League, Howard Jones and Belinda Carlisle live at the Araneta Coliseum 
October 14 – Tanduay Rhum Rockfest Year 5 live at SM Mall of Asia Open Grounds 
October 16:
Andrea Corr live at the Araneta Coliseum 
Sum 41 live at A-Venue, Makati
October 18 – Andrea Corr live at Waterfront Hotel, Lahug, Cebu City
October 18–23 – Stomp! live at Tanghalang Nicanor Abelardo, CCP, Pasay 
October 21 – Tahiti 80 live at 6/F The Tents at Alphaland Southgate 
October 25:
Hitman Returns – David Foster & Friends feat. Philip Bailey, Ashanti, Russell Watson, Michael Bolton and Charice live at the Araneta Coliseum 
The Black Eyed Peas live at SM Mall of Asia Open Grounds 
October 26 – Owl City live at NBC Tent 
October 30 – Jason Mraz live at the Araneta Coliseum
November 11 – Go West live at Eastwood Mall Open Park
November 12 – Go West live at Venice Piazza, McKinley Hill
November 19:
Children of Bodom live at the Amoranto Stadium
 Greyson Chance live at Eastwood Mall Open Park
November 20 – Greyson Chance live at Venice Piazza, McKinley Hill
November 26 – BBS featuring Kean Cipriano live at the Aliw Theater
November 30 – Pitbull live at the Araneta Coliseum
December 7 – Train live at the Araneta Coliseum
December 8:
Mike Posner live at Trinoma Mall, Quezon City
Y! Rocks Supports OPM feat. Wolfgang, Karl Roy, Urbandub, Wilabaliw, The Dawn, Hijo, Ang Bandang Shirley, Pedicab, The Jerks, Pupil, Taken by Cars, Paramita, Stonefree, Razorback, True Faith, Sandwich, Callalily, 6cyclemind, Tanya Markova, Not So Fast, SinoSikat, General Luna, Somedaydream, Mobbstarr, Badburn, Hilera, Gloc-9, Parokya ni Edgar, Archipelago and Franco live at SM Mall of Asia Open Grounds
Y! Rocks Supports OPM feat. Rico Blanco, Never the Strangers and Greyhoundz live at SM City Cebu
Y! Rocks Supports OPM feat. Ebe Dancel, Salamin and Ney live at SM City Davao
December 9:
Mike Posner live at Glorietta Mall, Makati
Richard Marx live at the Araneta Coliseum
December 10 – Mike Posner live at Alabang Town Center

Films

List of top films at the Philippine Box-Office chart published by Box Office Mojo.

Top-Grossing Filipino films for 2011

Sports
 February 4 – Basketball:  The Talk 'N Text Tropang Texters and the San Miguel Beermen will play for the 101st championship contested by the league. Talk 'N Text won the series, 4–2, capturing their 3rd title.
 February 19 – Boxing: Nonito Donaire defeats Fernando Montiel by technical knockout in the second round to unify the WBO and WBC bantamweight titles. Donaire started the fight strong by controlling most of the first round, landing a left hook that briefly stunned Montiel. In the second round, Donaire started landing a few combinations before finishing Montiel with a solid hook.
 May 7 – Boxing: Manny Pacquiao defeats Shane Mosley by unanimous decision to retain his WBO welterweight title.
 May 8 – Basketball:  The Talk 'N Text Tropang Texters and the Barangay Ginebra Kings will play for the 102nd championship contested by the league. Talk 'N Text won the series, 4–2, capturing their 4th title.
 July 4 – Football: After a Draw in away leg and a Win in home leg, Philippine Football Team wins over Sri Lanka in the first round of Asian qualifiers for the 2014 FIFA World Cup. This is the country's first win in the World Cup Qualifiers.
 July 23–24 – Basketball: On this days Smart Ultimate All Star launched the very rare moment of the history of basketball. Here the PBA All-Star Team and Smart Gilas faced the Smart All-Star (the team of NBA).
 July 28 – Football: The Philippine Football Team was eliminated in the 2014 FIFA World Cup qualifiers after losing both the home and away leg against Kuwait.
 August 21 – Basketball: The Petron Blaze Boosters defeated the Talk 'N Text Tropang Texters in seven games to win their 19th Philippine Basketball Association (PBA) championship and prevented Talk 'N Text from winning the Grand Slam. Arwind Santos was named the Finals MVP.
 September 15–25 – Basketball: The Philippine Basketball Team participated in the 2011 FIBA Asia Championship, held at Wuhan, China. The team made impressive performance, winning 7 games and losing 3, one in the preliminary round (against China), the second one in semi-finals (against Jordan), and the Bronze Medal match (against Korea), putting them into fourth place. Though it missed their chance to enter the Olympic Basketball Tournament, the team achieved the country's highest in 24 years.
 October 1 — Basketball: The Ateneo Blue Eagles wins series 2-0 has beaten the FEU Tamaraws, 82–69, to win their fourth straight in UAAP championships.
 October 4 – Football: Philippine Football Team placed Second in 2011 Long Teng Cup at Taiwan.
 October 22 – Boxing: Nonito Donaire wins a one-sided decision over Omar Andres Narvaez.
 October 26 – Basketball: The San Beda Red Lions wins series 2-0 has beaten the San Sebastian Stags, 57–55, to win their second straight in NCAA championships.
 November 11–22 – Multi Sport Event: The Philippine Team participated in the 26th Southeast Asian Games held in Jakarta and Palembang, Indonesia. Despite huge delegation and big expectations of grabbing 70 gold medals, the Philippines only got 36 gold out of 169 medals, placing them to sixth place.
 November 13 – Boxing: Pacquiao won the fight over Marquez by a majority decision in Las Vegas. The decision was controversial. He retained his WBO welterweight title.

Television

 September 12 – Shamcey Supsup, Bb. Pilipinas-Universe 2011, was the 3rd Runner-up at Miss Universe 2011 held at Sao Paulo, Brazil.
 November 6 – Gwendoline Ruais, Miss World-Philippines 2011, was the 1st Runner-up at Miss World 2011 held at London, United Kingdom.
 November 7 – Diane Necio, Bb. Pilipinas International 2011, was placed in Top 15 at Miss International 2011 held at China.
 December 3 – Athena Mae Imperial, Miss Philippines-Earth 2011, was crowned Miss Water at Miss Earth 2011 held at Quezon City.

Deaths
January 1 – Reynaldo Dagsa, Filipino politician, assassinated
January 5 – Agustin Perdices, 76, Filipino politician, Governor of Negros Oriental (since 2010), stomach cancer. (born 1935)
January 16 – Thelmo Cunanan, 72, Filipino general, diplomat and business executive (National Oil Company, SSS), cancer. (born 1939)
January 24 – Gerry Ortega, 47, RMN radio commentator and human activist (born 1963)
February 1 – Cirilo Gallardo, 38, disc jockey of radio DWWW Spirit 96.9 FM (born 1972)
February 2 – Federico Aguilar Alcuaz, painter, National Artist-designee (born 1932)
February 8 – Angelo Reyes, 65, retired Armed Forces Chief of Staff and Secretary of National Defense, suicide (born 1945)
February 12 – Ching Arellano, 50, actor and comedian (born 1960)
March 3 – Paquito Diaz, 73, actor and movie director (born 1937)
March 7 – Rodrigo Salud, 72, commissioner of the PBA from 1988 to 1992 (born 1938)
March 9 – Armando Goyena, 88, actor, pulmonary embolism (born 1922)
March 10 – Paul Toledo, singer-songwriter, heart attack
March 20 – John Apacible, 38, model-turned actor, gunshot wound (born 1973)
March 22 – Tomas Gonzalez, 41, stand-up comedian in Comedy Bar, heart attack (born 1969)
March 23 – Noriel Salazar, 49, former vice mayor of Alitagtag, Batangas (born 1961 or 1962)
March 24 – Len Flores Sumera, 44, DZME 1530 kHz radio anchor, gunshot wound (born 1966 or 1967)
April 17 – AJ Perez, 18, actor, vehicular accident (born 1993)
April 18 – Joe Pavia, 72, Filipino journalist, lung cancer (born 1938)
April 23 – Edwin Ramos, 47, DZBB-AM program coordinator, stab wound (born 1964)
April 24 – Juan Oro Rojo, Filipino musician. (born 1925)
April 28 – Leonor Ines-Luciano, 91, jurist, Court of Appeals Justice (1984–1989), sectoral Representative (1992–1998). (born 1919)
May 1 – Reynaldo Uy, 59, Filipino politician, Mayor of Calbayog, gunshot wound (born 1952)
May 13 – Chit Estella, 54, Journalist of Inquirer and Manila Times, car crash (born 1956)
May 15 – Maico Buncio, 22, motorcycle racer, racing accident. (born 1988)
May 23 – Alejandro Roces, 86, writer and government official, Secretary of Education (1961–1965) (born 1921)
May 27 – Regalado Maambong, 72, jurist, senatorial candidate for the 2010 election, member of 1986 Constitutional Commission. (born 1938)
May 31 – Conrado Estrella, Sr., 93, Filipino politician, Governor of Pangasinan (1954–1963), Agrarian Reform Minister (1978–1986).
June 13 – Romeo Olea, 49, radio news reporter DWEB Iriga City (born 1962)
June 26 – Jose Mari Avellana, 70, former stage actor and director/son of Lamberto Avellana, brain aneurysm (born 1941)
June 27 – Jo Ramos, 54, daughter of former President Fidel Ramos, lung cancer (born 1957)
July 7 – Miguel Gatan Purugganan, 79, Roman Catholic prelate, Bishop of Ilagan (1974–1999). (born 1942)
July 7 – Rizalino Navarro, 72, business executive, Secretary of Trade and Industry (1992–1996), heart attack (born 1938)
July 14 – Jaime C. Lopez, 77, Manila Congressman, heart surgery, (born 1934)
July 26 – Josephine C. Reyes, 82, educator, President of Far Eastern University (1985–1989) (born 1929)
July 28 – Agapito Lozada, 72, Olympic swimmer (born 1939)
August 3 – Antonio Diaz, 83, politician, Representative from Zambales (1969–1972, 1992–2001, 2004–2011) (born 1928)
August 6 – Fe del Mundo, 99, pediatrician, National Scientist of the Philippines, heart attack. (born 1911)
August 19 – Kerima Polotan Tuvera, 85, author and journalist. (born 1925)
August 21 – Edith Tiempo, 92, author, poet and novelist, National Artist of the Philippines, heart attack. (born 1919)
September 21 – Ben Feleo, 85, film director. (born 1925–1926)
October 12 – Augustus Cezar, Polytechnic University of the Philippines, Vice President for Administration, gunshot wound.
October 29 – Ram Revilla, 23, Filipino actor, half brother of Sen. Ramon "Bong" Revilla Jr. and son of former actor and Sen. Ramon Revilla Sr. (born 1989)
October 31 – Ricky Pempengco, 43, Estranged Father of International Singer Charice Pempengco.(born 1968)
November 2 – Boots Plata, Filipino movie director and writer. (born 1943)
November 11 – Lito Calzado, 65, former TV director/choreographer and father of actress Iza Calzado, liver cancer (born 1946)
November 22 – Alberto Reynoso, 71, Philippine Basketball Association player (born 1940)
December 1 – Purificacion Quisumbing, 77, Chairperson, Commission on Human Rights (2002–2008), multiple myeloma. (born 1934)
December 5 – RJ (Roseo José) Rosales, 37, Filipino-Australian singer and stage actor (born 1974)
December 15 – William Claver, 75, Filipino human rights lawyer, Congressman from Kalinga-Apayao (1987–1992).
December 15 – Nimfa C. Vilches, Filipino judge (born 1956)
December 19 – Florencio Manimtim, Jr. 52, Vice-Mayor of Talisay, Batangas, gunshot wound (born 1959)
December 29 – Tyron Perez, 26, Filipino actor, TV host, model, former StarStruck Alumni Batch 1 (born 1985)

References

 
2011 in Southeast Asia
Philippines
2010s in the Philippines
Years of the 21st century in the Philippines